In geometry, the small rhombidodecacron is a nonconvex isohedral polyhedron. It is the dual of the small rhombidodecahedron. It is visually identical to the Small dodecacronic hexecontahedron. It has 60 intersecting antiparallelogram faces.

Proportions
The ratio between the lengths of the long edges and the short ones equals , which is the golden ratio. The dihedral angle equals .

References

External links 
 
 Uniform polyhedra and duals

Dual uniform polyhedra